U.S. Route 50 (US 50) runs east–west across the southern part of the state of Ohio, passing through Cincinnati, Chillicothe, and Athens. It is mainly a two-lane road except for the easternmost and westernmost parts. Near Athens it runs concurrently with State Route 32 (SR 32), a four-lane divided highway known as Corridor D, and from Coolville to the Ohio–West Virginia border it also overlaps SR 7 before crossing into Parkersburg, West Virginia.

Route description

US 50 enters Ohio from Indiana at a traffic light with State Line Road. The route heads northeast as a four-lane undivided highway, passing through farmland and paralleling the tracks of the former Baltimore and Ohio and Big Four Railroad tracks. The highway passes under Interstate 275 before entering the extreme western suburbs of the greater Cincinnati area. The road has an at-grade crossing with former Big Four branch line railroad track, before curving southeast. US 50 has a traffic signal at the intersection with SR 128. Southeast of SR 128, US 50 becomes a four-lane divided highway and crosses over the Great Miami River. After the river the route enters Cleves and curves due south and passes through residential properties. In Cleves the highway has a traffic signal with SR 264, before leaving Cleves and entering North Bend. In North Bend the road continues to pass through woodland and residential properties, before passing the monument and tomb of President William Henry Harrison. The highway curves east-southeast and becomes a four-lane undivided highway, before leaving North Bend. The road parallels the Ohio River and passes through a mix of woodland, residential and industrial properties. The route begins to curve northeast and enters Cincinnati.

US 50 begins a concurrency with SR 264, at an intersection in the Lower Price Hill neighborhood of Cincinnati. The two routes heads east and is locally known as the Sixth Street Expressway (from Interstate 75 in Queensgate to the Waldvogel Viaduct, which continues to Lower Price Hill). The expressway heads east as a six-lane divided highway passing through industrial properties. As the highway heads east it crosses over a railroad track and the Mill Creek. East of the Mill Creek, the road passes under a railroad track, before an eastbound exit towards Mehring Way. Followed by a westbound entrance from Harriet Street, before passing under another railroad track. The highway has an interchange with Freeman Avenue, this interchange does not have a westbound exit. The expressway passes over some railroad tracks and Linn Street, followed by an eastbound entrance and westbound exit to and from  Linn Street. East of the interchange with Linn Street, is a bridge over Gest Street, with a westbound exit. After Gest Street, is an interchange with SR 264, this interchange serves downtown Cincinnati. The Sixth Street Expressway ends at an interchange with Interstate 75 (I–75) and Second Street. US 50 curves southeast and begins a concurrency with I–71.

I–71 and US 50 head east through downtown on an expressway locally known as Fort Washington Way. Fort Washington Way is an eight-lane divided depressed expressway, passing under five city streets. The highway passes Paul Brown Stadium and Great American Ballpark, before I–71 leaves US 50. East of I–71, US 50 is locally known as Columbia Parkway, a four-lane divided highway. The parkway curves northeast having an interchange with I–471, on the east side of downtown. After I–71 the route passes through residential areas, parallel to the Ohio River. The road has an eastbound exit and a westbound entrance interchange with Martin Drive. After Martin Drive the roadway passes through woodland areas as a six-lane undivided highway. The parkway has an eastbound slip ramp with U.S. Route 50 Truck, east of this ramp trucks are not allowed. After the slip ramp the highway curves east, passing over Collins Avenue and having a traffic signal at Torrence Parkway and William Howard Taft Road. East of the traffic signal the route curves southeast having a traffic signal at Delta Avenue. East of Delta Avenue, the roadway becomes a four-lane undivided highway, having a traffic signal at Stanley Avenue. The route becomes a four-lane divided highway, before making a very sharp northeast.

After the sharp curve US 50 heads northeast, having an interchange at SR 32, SR 125, and SR 561, the street is locally known as Beechmont Avenue. Northeast of Beechmont Avenue the parkway crosses over both Linwood Avenue and Heekin Avenue, before an interchange with Eastern Avenue. The Eastern Avenue interchange only allows for westbound exit and eastbound entrance, it is also the eastern terminus of US 50 Truck. From this interchange east truck are allowed. The route enters Fairfax and crosses a few small bridges before an interchange with Red Bank Road. The highway passes through commercial properties having a traffic signal at Wooster Pike. The traffic signal at Wooster Pike is the eastern terminus of the Columbia Parkway.

US 50 heads northeast, locally known as Wooster Pike. The route heads through commercial properties as a two-lane undivided highway, passing through Fairfax and into Mariemont. In Mariemont US 50 becomes a two-lane divided highway passing through residential properties. The roadway becomes a four-lane divided highway in the business area of Mariemont. After leaving the business area of Mariemont the route becomes a four-lane undivided highway, passing through Plainville. The route becomes a two-lane highway with a center turn lane, at an intersection with Newtown Road. The road curves northeast, passing north of the Kroger Hills State Reserve The highway enters Terrace Park, having an intersection with SR 126, this intersection is also the western terminus of SR 28. Just before crossing the river, the route passes under an old railroad bridge that now hosts the Little Miami Scenic Trail. Both US 50 and SR 28 cross over the Little Miami River and enters the City of Milford. The route curves southeast, before turning northeast, passing through the downtown area of Milford. North of downtown the roadway curves east, passing through residential properties, with some commercial properties.

The concurrency turns northeast and has a six-way intersection, where US 50 turns southeast and SR 28 continues northeast. US 50 heads southeast as a four-lane undivided highway, passing through commercial properties. The highway has a traffic signal at SR 131 and Milford Parkway, Milford Parkway gives access to I–275. Southeast of this intersection the roadway narrows to a two-lane divided highway. The highway passes under I–275, with no access. The route curves due south and has an intersection with SR 450 (Milford Parkway), SR 450 has access to I–275.

East of Milford, US 50 becomes a two-lane highway as it travels through Hillsboro and Bainbridge before reaching the outskirts of Chillicothe. In Chillicothe, US 50 becomes Western Avenue and then Main Street before merging with U.S. Route 23 and U.S. Route 35 east of the city. State Route 104 overlaps US 50 through downtown Chillicothe.  As US 50 leaves Chillicothe it becomes a two-lane highway once again as it winds its way through McArthur and heavy forested Southern Ohio before reaching the outskirts of Athens where it becomes a four-lane highway.  It remains four-lane until reaching the Ohio River.  US 50 joins with State Route 32 near the Ohio University Bush Airport–Snyder Field in Albany, west of Athens.  US 50 intersects with U.S. Route 33 east of the city before continuing eastward toward Belpre and the Ohio River. US 50 begins to overlap SR 7 near Reedsville as it heads north along the river, and splits from SR 7 before it crosses the river on the Blennerhassett Island Bridge to Parkersburg, West Virginia.

History
In 1912 the route that would become US 50 was designated Main Market Route 45. In 1923, Main Market Route 45 was decommissioned and  SR 7 replaced it from Indiana to Cincinnati. SR 27 from Cincinnati to Milford and SR 26 from Milford to Athens. US 50 replaced SR 144 from Athens to Coolville and SR 7 from Coolville to West Virginia state line. At this time the route that later became US 50 was paved between Indiana and Highland–Ross county line. In 1926 US 50 was signed on a route similar to today. The current route that US 50 between Athens and West Virginia became US 50S in 1929, with the current SR 550 becoming US 50N. US 50S and US 50N would be replaced with US 50 and US 50 Alt, in 1935.

The Columbia Parkway in Cincinnati was completed in 1941 and US 50 was rerouted onto the parkway. The road west of Cincinnati became a four-lane divided highway in 1949. In 1965 the Sixth Street Expressway open and US 50 was rerouted onto the expressway. Also in that year the section of US 50 that is concurrency with SR 7 became a four-lane divided highway. US 50 was routed onto the eastern section of the Athens bypass when it open, in 1977. The western section was opened in 1979 and US 50 was route onto that year. US 50 between Athens and Coolville became a four-lane divided highway between 1997 and 1999. Between 2003 and 2007 a new bridge across the Ohio River was built.

The section of the Columbia Parkway between William Howard Taft Road/Torrence Parkway and Delta Avenue has numerous abandoned staircases built into the Art Deco retaining walls (which were constructed in 1938 as part of the Works Progress Administration). The City of Cincinnati began the process of sealing up these staircases in 2008.

Major intersections

References

External links

 Ohio
50
U.S. Route 50
Transportation in Hamilton County, Ohio
Transportation in Clermont County, Ohio
Transportation in Brown County, Ohio
Transportation in Highland County, Ohio
Transportation in Ross County, Ohio
Transportation in Vinton County, Ohio
Transportation in Athens County, Ohio
Transportation in Washington County, Ohio